Peter Gerber is the name of:
Peter Gerber (politician) (1923–2012), Swiss politician and President of the Swiss Council of States
Peter Gerber (boxer) (born 1944)
Peter Gerber (sailor) (born 1944), Austrian sailor
Peter Gerber (ice dancer) (born 1992), Polish ice dancer